The Secretary State for International Cooperation (SECI) is a senior minister of the Ministry of Foreign Affairs, European Union and Cooperation of the Spanish government. The SECIPIC is appointed by the King with the advise of the Foreign Minister.

The Secretary State for International Cooperation is responsible for the Spanish international cooperation for development policies (especially focused on Latin America and Africa).

As the highest official in charge of the Spanish international cooperation, the SECIPIC is also the President of the Spanish Agency for International Development Cooperation (AECID).

History
The international cooperation and development policy of Spain exists since the Francoist Spain and the relations with Latin America since the independence of their current states.

During the first years of democracy, the competences over this matters were attached to bodies with the rank of directorate-general or less, however, the socialist government of Felipe Gonzalez decided in 1985 to create the current Secretariat of State with the aim to get an "effective cooperation with all the peoples of the Earth", a mandate collected in the preamble of the Spanish Constitution (Constitution § Preamble).

Although international cooperation for development is destined for countries around the world, due to historical and cultural ties most of this Spanish cooperation goes to Latin America and the former Spanish territories of Africa like Equatorial Guinea, Morocco or Western Sahara, and also to Asian countries such as the Philippines, also former Spanish territories.

The most significant change since its creation was in 2004, when the competencies of the foreign policy of Spain in Ibero-American were transferred to the Secretariat of State for Foreign Affairs, competences that were recovered in very late 2011.

In 2017 the name was extended to include the Caribbean in the denomination in order to target the objective of at-that-time Foreign Minister Alfonso Dastis to impulse the relations with that geographical area. In 2020, the Secretariat of State lost is responsibilities over Ibero-American affairs.

Name
 Secretary of State for International Cooperation and for Ibero-America (1985-2004)
 Secretary of State for International Cooperation (2004-2011)
 Secretary of State for International Cooperation and for Ibero-America (2011-2017)
 Secretary of State for International Cooperation and for Ibero-America and the Caribbean (2017–2020)
 Secretary of State for International Cooperation (2020–present)

Structure
The Secretariat of State is divided in two departments:
 The Directorate-General for Sustainable Development Policies.
 It's the department responsible for the execution of the Spanish International Cooperation and Development Plan respecting the framework established by the Sustainable Development Goals of the United Nations and coordinating the different public administrations. It's also responsible for participate in the international meetings about its competences (particularly of the European Union but also with the UN, G20, OECD, among others) and the negotiation of international treaties about this matter.
 It's divided in three departments: the Deputy Directorates-General for Planning and Policy Coherence and for Multilateral and European Development Policies and the Division for Evaluation of Policies for Development and Knowledge Management.
The Director-General for Sustainable Development Policies is the Vice-president of the Spanish Agency for International Development Cooperation.

Although they are not departments and act with autonomy, the Spanish Agency for International Development Cooperation, the Cervantes Institute and the Royal Academy of Spain in Rome depend from the Secretariat of State.

List of SECIPICs
 Luis Yáñez-Barnuevo (August 30, 1985 – April 10, 1991)
 Inocencio Arias (April 10-1991-September 18, 1993)
 José Luis Dicenta Ballester (September 18, 1993 – December 23, 1995)
 Miguel Ángel Carriedo Mompín (December 23, 1995 – May 14, 1996)
 Fernando María Villalonga Campos (May 14, 1996 – May 6, 2000)
 Miguel Ángel Cortés Martín (May 6, 2000 – April 20, 2004)
 Leire Pajín (April 20, 2004 – July 12, 2008)
 Maria Soraya Rodriguez Ramos (July 12, 2008 – December 24, 2011)
 Jesús Manuel Gracia Aldaz (January 6, 2012 – December 12, 2016)
 Fernando García Casas (December 12, 2016 – June 23, 2018)
 Juan Pablo de Laiglesia (June 23, 2018 – February 5, 2020)
 Ángeles Moreno Bau (February 5, 2020 – July 21, 2021)
 Pilar Cancela Rodríguez (July 21, 2021 – present)

See also
 Directorate-General for International Cooperation and Development
 European Development Fund

References

Secretaries of State of Spain
Foreign ministers of Spain
International development agencies